The 2020 Súper TC2000 Championship was the 42nd season of Turismo Competición 2000 and the 9th season of Súper TC2000, the premier touring car category of Argentina. It started in September 2020 and finished in February 2021 having been affected by the COVID-19 pandemic in Argentina. Matías Rossi won the championship, his second of the Súper TC2000 era and fifth overall.

Teams and drivers

Changes 

 The two main novelties for the season were the arrival of the private Midas Carrera Team and Monti Motorsport teams. Also, the Citroën subsidiary officially stopped supporting the FDC team.

 Julián Santero missed the second race for positive COVID-19, while Matías Milla didn't participate in the third for the same reason. In both cases, they were not replaced by another driver in those races.
 Hernán Palazzo stopped racing for Toyota Gazoo Racing Argentina in October and was replaced by Franco Vivian. Palazzo returned at ninth race and Vivian at eleventh race.
 Matías Cravero replaced José Manuel Sapag when competed in WTCR and TCR Europe.
 The Fiat Racing Team STC2000 didn't participate in the fourth and fifth races due to several cases of COVID-19 within it.
 Nicolás Traut participated in the seventh race of the year.
Fiat Racing Team STC2000 did not participate in the 10 and 11 races.
In race 11, José Manuel Sapag replaced José Manuel Urcera (in Monti Motorsport) and Diego Ciantini replaced Valentín Aguirre (in Midas Carrera Team). Damián Fineschi participated in this race with a Fiat from the Fineschi Racing.

Calendar

Race calendar and results

Championship standings

Teams' championship

Manufacturers' championship

References

External links
 

Súper TC2000
Súper TC2000
Súper TC2000
Súper TC2000
TC 2000 Championship seasons